Radio Moscow is the self-titled debut album by American psychedelic rock band Radio Moscow. Recorded in Akron, Ohio in July 2006, the album was produced by Dan Auerbach and released by Alive Naturalsound Records on February 27, 2007.

Reception

Reviewing Radio Moscow for music website AllMusic, Greg Prato awarded the album three and a half out of five stars, comparing the band to a number of artists from the 1970s, including Ram Jam ("Luckydutch"), The Allman Brothers Band ("Lickskillet") and The Jeff Beck Group ("Mistreating Queen" and "Whatever Happened").

Track listing

Personnel
Radio Moscow
Parker Griggs – vocals, guitars, drums, percussion
Luke McDuff – bass
Additional personnel
Dan Auerbach – production, engineering, slide guitar (track 8)
Chris Keffer – mastering
Anthony Yankovic – artwork

References

Radio Moscow (band) albums
2007 albums
Alive Naturalsound Records albums
Albums produced by Dan Auerbach